Yuzbashevan is a village in the Qabala Rayon of Azerbaijan, with an elevation of 1,811 metres (5,942 feet).

References 

Populated places in Qabala District